Abercynon railway station is the railway station serving the village of Abercynon in the Cynon Valley, Wales. Passenger services are provided by Transport for Wales.

History 

It was first opened on this site as "Navigation Road" in 1840 and was then renamed "Aberdare Junction" by the Taff Vale Railway in 1846 then further renamed "Abercynon" in 1896 and to "Abercynon South" in 1988. The original station buildings, including the Great Western Railway signal box of 1932 (which originally came from Birmingham Moor Street station) have been demolished, with the signal box being demolished near the end of 2013.

From a date "no sooner than 1st May 2008" as the notice ran, all services were to be transferred to Abercynon South, which would be rebuilt (with the reinstatement of the disused "up" side of the island platform) to accommodate all services serving both stations.

Following the merger of Abercynon North and South, the latter station's name reverted to simply "Abercynon".

On 14 December 2010, a free Park and Ride car park opened on the site of the station yard, with capacity for 160 cars. This is hoped to improve commuter travel to Cardiff and other areas on the Valley Lines network. This was funded by the Welsh Assembly Government and the European Regional Development Fund.

On 26 and 27 April 2012, the British Royal Train visited the station as part of the tour of the Diamond Jubilee of Elizabeth II. The train had to stop at Abercynon due to the tight curves on the line, with the Royals continuing their journey by road.

In October 2013 the Signal Box (out of use since the aforementioned 2008 remodelling & resignalling) was removed and a new Ticket Vending Machine was installed on the station to enable travellers to purchase tickets before boarding a train as well printing tickets for pre-booked journeys.  The layout is currently controlled from an interim signalling centre next to the 'up' (Cardiff-bound) platform. This was due to hand over control to the Cardiff Rail Operating Centre in 2014 as part of the wider modernisation of the area ahead of electrification of the Valley Lines network, but still appears to be under control.

On 21 February 2015, a blue plaque was unveiled at the station entrance to mark the location of trade unionist John Ewington's workplace. His claim against his employer, the Taff Vale Railway Company for unfair treatment led to the famous Taff Vale Case which was fundamental in the creation of the Labour Party.

In February 2016 work started at the station to improve the facilities ahead of the South Wales Metro system. Work included the installation of an extra shelter and a bike shelter where the old signal box stood. Transport for Wales replaced an existing shelter with a larger one including TFW branding in Spring 2019.

In December 2017 Rhondda Cynon Taff funded the expansion of the car park to increase the number of spaces for users. There are future plans to further increase the number of spaces which is a reflection of the popularity of the site for commuters. In April 2019, Rhondda Cynon Taf council opened a further extension to the car park. An extra 310 spaces have been built in the nearby Navigation Park to cater for future increase in demand. Other work included adapting the footpath to the station and adding a bus stop in the existing car park. The council also installed signs at both entrances explaining the history of Abercynon and its transport history. The project was funded by the Welsh Government.

In October 2018, it was announced that the South Wales Metro would receive £119 million from the European Union. Some of this money is earmarked for doubling the line from Abercynon and Aberdare and from Abercynon to Merthyr Tydfil. Extra platforms would also be built to handle the extra services.

Service 
During a typical off-peak service, Abercynon is served by four southbound trains per hour, with all trains stopping at Cardiff Central. 2-3 of those trains then continue to Barry Island and an hourly service operates to Bridgend via The Vale of Glamorgan Line. 3 trains per day off-peak are also scheduled to terminate at Cardiff Central rather than continuing south.

Northbound services operate twice hourly to Merthyr Tydfil and twice hourly to Aberdare Monday to Saturday.

On Sundays, southbound services generally operate every two hours to Barry Island and Bridgend via The Vale of Glamorgan Line, and northbound service operate every two hours to Merthyr Tydfil and every two hours to Aberdare. From April 2018, Arriva Trains Wales increased morning and late afternoon services between Aberdare and Cardiff. This has given an hourly service between Aberdare and Cardiff in the morning and late afternoon.

References 

 
 
 Abercynon station on navigable O.S. map

External links 

Railway stations in Rhondda Cynon Taf
DfT Category F1 stations
Former Taff Vale Railway stations
Railway stations in Great Britain opened in 1840
Railway stations served by Transport for Wales Rail